Lion's Share are a heavy metal band, formed in Sundsvall, Sweden in 1987 and later relocated to Stockholm, by guitarist Lars Chriss, and keyboardist Kay Backlund. The band has since experienced multiple line-up changes, with Lars Chriss the only constant presence in the band through the years. Some of the past members are now or have been featured in bands such as King Diamond, HammerFall, Treat, Sorcerer, Therion, Glenn Hughes, The Poodles, and 220 Volt.

Members

Current members
 Lars Chriss – guitars
 Nils Patrik Johansson – vocals

Former members
 Anders Engberg – vocals
 Andy Loos – bass
 Kay Backlund – keyboard
 Pontus Egberg – bass
 Johan Koleberg – drums
 Tony Niva – vocals
 Sampo Axelsson – bass
 Magnus Ulfstedt – drums (live only)

Discography

Studio albums

Lion's Share (1995)
Two (1997)
Fall From Grace (1999)
Entrance (2001)
Emotional Coma (2007)
Dark Hours (2009)

EP

EP (2018)

Singles
Ghost Town Queen (1988)
Flash in the Night (1997)
Chain Child (2019)
We Are What We Are (2019)
Pentagram (2019)

Demos
Demo 1988 (1988)
Demo 1990 (1990)
Demo 1991 (1991)
Sins of a Father (1995)

Live albums

Magic Circle Festival Vol.1 Manowar DVD (2008)

References

External links
Lion's Share official website

Swedish rock music groups
Swedish heavy metal musical groups